The Alstom Metropolis is a family of electric multiple units designed and produced by the French rolling stock manufacturer Alstom. It is designed for high capacity rapid transit or metro rail infrastructure systems. Trains can be run in various configurations, the length alone varying between two and ten cars; it is also suitable for both manned or unmanned operations.

More than 4,000 Metropolis cars have been manufactured, the type is reportedly in service with 50 operators distributed around the world. Cities operating the Metropolis include Singapore, Shanghai, Budapest, Warsaw, Nanjing, Buenos Aires, São Paulo, Lima, Santiago, Barcelona, Guadalajara, Istanbul, Santo Domingo, Chennai, Kochi, Dubai, Lucknow, Sydney, Amsterdam and Xiamen.

Design features 
Alstom's Metropolis family of electric multiple units is highly adaptable; the basic body can significantly vary in size between small, medium and wide configurations to meet a variety of client's needs. A typical trainset is deployed in two to six car arrangement. The Metropolis has been designed to be both flexible and reliable, incorporating a high level of technology to do so. The propulsion system incorporates the ONIX (ONduleur à Intégration eXceptionnelle) or OPTONIX VVVF drive with IGBT transistors that control asynchronous 3-phase alternating current (AC) traction motors. Amongst other abilities, this arrangement enables regenerative braking, reducing the train's energy consumption.

It can be configured to operated as part of an entirely automated driverless system, enabling the train to have unattended train operation (UTO) functionality. To achieve this, Alstom typically offers the Metropolis as one element of a complete turnkey system, including the trainset itself along with the signalling system, track works and services. Several operators have procured the train in such a configuration, including the Sydney Metro (Australia’s first fully-automated rail network) and the Budapest Metro (the first automated metro line in Central-Eastern Europe).

It can be fitted with either steel wheels or rubber tyres, depending upon the customer’s requirement. As standard, each Metropolis features a trainborne Ethernet backbone, providing resilient broadband communications for subsystems, including security apparatus, an optional public address system, and passenger information equipment; these are organised into integrated modules within the onboard security and communications subsystems. For ease of maintenance, the Metropolis is compatible with an internet-delivered TrainTracer tool, which monitors major components of each train and can display condition information in real-time to depots and operational control centres alike.

The interior can also be customised as per customer requirements. Optional features include closed-circuit television (CCTV), wider seats, additional grabpoles, more space around the doors, wheelchair space and equipped with electronic displays - the latter is typically used to depict journey information, safety messages and advertisements. The size of the doors can be customised along with the width of the gangways, while a modular seating arrangement is typically installed. A specialised glass named Climavit is used for the windows, it is supplied by the French manufacturer Sekurit Saint-Gobain; amongst its claimed benefits is a reduction in the typical internal noise level by five decibels.

Major deployments 
During July 2006, OPRET signed an initial contract for the supply of 19 Metropolis trainsets to equip the first line of the Santo Domingo Metro with Alstom; these were configured to be nearly identical to the 9000 series on the Barcelona Metro save for the livery applied. In January 2011, an order was announced for a further 15 Alstom trainsets for Line 2. During March 2012, the first trainsets for the second line were delivered to the operator.

Alstom secured a $253m (€200m) order in February 2010 from GVB for 23 six-car Type M5 Metropolis trainsets for the Amsterdam Metro. Three years later, this was followed by an supplemental order, valued at €42m ($53m), for five more trains. Each being configured to carry up to 1,000 passengers, they have replaced all of the legacy M1-M3 sets on the East Line as well as increased overall capacity, being used on all routes except Route 51.

During March 2012, Singapore's Land Transport Authority placed an order valued at $303m for the supply of 34 Metropolis trains, 18 of which were for the North East Line (NEL) while the remaining 16 were allocated to Circle Line (CCL). Furthermore, accompanying signalling upgrades for both of these lines was also included in the arrangement.

A total of 15 Metropolis trainsets were ordered for Hungary’s Budapest Metro. During March 2014, operations of the type on the Metro's underground line four commenced, thus becoming the first automated metro line in Central-Eastern Europe.

In 2010, Alstrom secured a large order, valued at approximately $307m (€243m), to supply 42 train sets for Phase I of the Chennai Metro. The trains are air-conditioned with electrically operated automatic sliding doors and a regenerative braking system. During July 2014, Alstom delivered the first pair of Metropolis trainsets, which were the first trains to be manufactured at Alstom's new Indian production site. 

During September 2014, Alstom was awarded a substantial contract to equip the Sydney Metro Northwest, Australia’s first fully-automated rail network. The deal involved the production and supply of 22 six-car Metropolis train sets, along with the communications-based train control (CBTC) signalling infrastructure to facilitate its automated operations.

In November 2020, Alstom secured an order of 13 six-car Metropolis BM4 trains for use on Bucharest Metro line M5, for 100 million euros, which can be expanded up to 240 million euros for an extra 17 trains. These will also be equipped with Alstom's URBALIS 400 CBTC system onboard for STO operation.

Rolling stock 

 For Singapore
 Alstom Metropolis C751A
 Alstom Metropolis C830
 Alstom Metropolis C830C
 Alstom Metropolis C751C
 Alstom Metropolis C851E (from 2024 onwards)
 For Poland 
 For Barcelona and Latin America
 Barcelona Metro 9000 Series
 For Buenos Aires
 Buenos Aires Underground 100 Series
 Buenos Aires Underground 300 Series
 For Paris
 MP 89
 MF 01 (MF 2000)
 MP 05
 MP 14
 MR3V/MR6V
 MRV
 For Santiago NS 93
 
 
 For Budapest AM5-M2
 AM4-M4
 For Amsterdam M5 SeriesFor SydneyMetropolis Stock
 For Montreal'
 Saint-Laurent model

Gallery

Systems which use Metropolis cars 

 Abidjan Metro (starting from 2028)
 Amsterdam Metro
 Athens Metro (starting from 2027)
 Barcelona Metro
 Bucharest Metro (starting from Q4 2022)
 Budapest Metro
 Buenos Aires Underground
 Caracas Metro
 Chennai Metro
 Dubai Metro
 Federal District Metro
 Guadalajara light rail system
 Hanoi Metro 
 Istanbul Metro
 Kochi Metro
 Lima Metro
 Los Teques Metro
 Lucknow Metro
 Montreal REM (Starting from 2023)
 Mumbai Metro  Aqua Line (Line 3) (Starting from 2021)
 Nanjing Metro
 Panama Metro
 Paris Metro
 Riyadh Metro
 Santiago Metro
 Santo Domingo Metro
 São Paulo Metro
 Shanghai Metro
 Singapore MRT
 Sydney Metro
 Taipei Metro (starting from 2023)
 Warsaw Metro
 Xiamen Metro

Production

 France: Valenciennes
 Poland: Alstom Konstal in Chorzów
 Spain: Santa Perpetua de Mogoda
 Brazil: Lapa
 China: CRRC Nanjing Puzhen in Nanjing and Shanghai Alstom (joint venture between Alstom and Shanghai Electric) in Shanghai
 India: Sri City, Andhra Pradesh

See also 
 Movia
 Siemens Inspiro

References

External links 

 ALSTOM Transport Metropolis
 METROPOLIS, A fine blend between standardization and customization
 METROPOLIS, A fine blend between standardization and customization
 Fully automatic metros

Alstom multiple units
Subterranean rapid transit